Rancho Melijo, or Milijo, named after a local Kumeyaay village.  It was later called Rancho La Punta for the location of the Arguello family ranch house, on a point of hills overlooking the south end of San Diego Bay, north of the Otay River and east of where the river entered the south bend of the bay.  It was a Mexican land grant rancho, granted by Governor José Figueroa in 1833 to Santiago E. Argüello.

The rancho covered a square league of land extending 1 league north of the San Antonio Hills and 1 league east of the Pacific Ocean from the mouth of the Tijuana River, including its estuary and the plain east up the lower Tijuan Valley, amounting to 4,439 acres of land.  The southern part of the land was adjacent to his fathers Rancho Ti Juan and Rancho San Antonio Abad  It extended from the foot of the range of hills that the 1856 county map calls the San Antonio Hills just above the modern border of Mexico, to as far north as to include the south end of the San Diego Bay where the Otay River entered the bay and the southern part of the hills on the north side of the Otay River.

The claim (91 SD) with the California Land Commission was rejected and failed in appeals to higher courts. The Argüello family retained some of the land, homesteading it in the vicinity of the ranch house north of the Otay River and by the bay.

The Rancho Melijo included all of modern Imperial Beach, part of southwestern Chula Vista and the Tijuana River Valley, Otay Mesa West, Nestor and Palm City, neighborhoods of southern San Diego.  The ranch house fell into ruin in the 20th century and was razed to make way for the I-5 freeway.

See also

References

California ranchos
Ranchos of San Diego County, California
Chula Vista, California
1833 establishments in Alta California